Juan Felipe Alves Ribeiro, better known as Juan Felipe, (born 5 December 1987) is a Brazilian footballer who plays as a midfielder for Enosis Neon Paralimni.

Career
Juan Felipe played for Santo Andre and Red Bull Brasil, before moving to Bolivia in 2012 to play for Oriente Petrolero. Felipe only made nine league appearances during the season with Oriente Petrolero, scoring one goal. After one season in the Liga de Fútbol Profesional Boliviano he moved to São Carlos.

On 12 July 2014, Juan Felipe signed with Bulgarian side CSKA Sofia on a two-year deal. He made his debut in a 4–0 home win over Haskovo on 10 August, coming on as a second-half substitute. His first goal came twenty days later, netting the 3rd in a 3–0 away win over Lokomotiv Plovdiv. On 30 November, Felipe missed a penalty for CSKA in a 0–0 draw against Marek Dupnitsa at Bonchuk Stadium.

On 29 March 2018, Felipe signed a one-year contract, with the option of an additional year, with Kazakhstan Premier League club FC Kairat.

Club statistics

Honours

Club
Vardar
Macedonian First League: 2015–16, 2016–17
Macedonian Super Cup: 2015

References

External links
Juan Felipe at playmakerstats.com (English version of ogol.com.br)

1987 births
Living people
Brazilian footballers
Association football midfielders
Esporte Clube Santo André players
Red Bull Brasil players
Oriente Petrolero players
São Carlos Futebol Clube players
PFC CSKA Sofia players
FK Vardar players
FC Kairat players
Campeonato Brasileiro Série C players
Bolivian Primera División players
First Professional Football League (Bulgaria) players
Macedonian First Football League players
Kazakhstan Premier League players
Brazilian expatriate footballers
Brazilian expatriate sportspeople in Bolivia
Brazilian expatriate sportspeople in Bulgaria
Brazilian expatriate sportspeople in North Macedonia
Brazilian expatriate sportspeople in Kazakhstan
Expatriate footballers in Bolivia
Expatriate footballers in Bulgaria
Expatriate footballers in North Macedonia
Expatriate footballers in Kazakhstan
People from São Vicente, São Paulo
Footballers from São Paulo (state)